Lithium battery may refer to:

 Lithium metal battery, a non-rechargeable battery with lithium as an anode
 Rechargeable lithium metal battery, a rechargeable counterpart to the lithium metal battery
 Lithium-ion battery, a rechargeable battery in which lithium ions move from the negative electrode to the positive electrode during discharge and back when charging
 Thin-film lithium-ion battery, a solid-state lithium-ion battery constructed as a thin-film
 Aqueous lithium-ion battery
 Lithium-ion flow battery
 Lithium ion manganese oxide battery
 Lithium polymer battery
 Lithium–sulfur battery
 Lithium-titanate battery
 Lithium–air battery
 Lithium iron phosphate battery
 Nickel–lithium battery
 Lithium–silicon battery
 Lithium vanadium phosphate battery
 Lithium hybrid organic battery

Solution of lithium tetrachloroaluminate in thionyl chloride is the liquid cathode and electrolyte of some lithium batteries, e.g. the lithium-thionyl chloride cell. Another cathode-electrolyte formulation is lithium tetrachloroaluminate + thionyl chloride + sulfur dioxide + bromine.

Other salts used in lithium battery electrolytes are lithium bromide, lithium perchlorate, lithium tetrafluoroborate, and lithium hexafluorophosphate; less common ones are lithium chloride, lithium iodide, lithium chlorate, lithium nitrate, lithium hexafluoroarsenate,  lithium hexafluorosilicate (i.e. lithium and hexafluorosilicic acid), lithium bis(trifluoromethanesulfonyl)imide, and lithium trifluoromethanesulfonate.

See also
List of battery types
Lithium batteries in China
High capacity oceanographic lithium battery pack
Glass battery, which may use a lithium metal electrode
Subtopics of the lithium-ion battery:
Environmental impacts of lithium-ion batteries
History of the lithium-ion battery
Nanoarchitectures for lithium-ion batteries
Research in lithium-ion batteries

References